The Kit Fox Hills are a mountain range in Inyo County, California.

References 

Mountain ranges of Northern California
Mountain ranges of Inyo County, California